Trade Air d.o.o. is a Croatian passenger and cargo charter airline headquartered in Zagreb and based at Zagreb Airport. The company is registered as an airline whose main activities are passenger charter flights and cargo operations, organised either on charter chain flights or ad hoc flights. Trade Air also specialises in the transportation of dangerous goods.

History 

Trade Air was established in April 1994 and started operations on 22 May 1995. It is a private company fully owned by Mihajlo Cvijin. In April 1999, the airline started to operate their first Let L-410 Turbolet aircraft, with two more aircraft of the same type added to their fleet during the summer of 2000.

In 2004, the airline added two Fokker 100 aircraft to their fleet and started to use them to operate charter flights for passengers in March 2005. In November 2007, Trade Air operated flights with their Fokker 100 aircraft in Australia, transporting journalists as one of two dedicated carriers for the Australian federal elections. Both Fokker 100 aircraft operated by the airline were painted in the Sun Adria, now Trade Air Fokker 40 livery.

Between November 2004 and February 2005, Trade Air based one of its Let 410s in Bosnia and Herzegovina, in a short-lived and ultimately failed attempt to operate flights between Mostar and Zagreb under the Bosnia Airlines brand.

In March 2007, the airline was anonymously accused of allegedly overloading their aircraft with cargo and having pilots who allegedly flew every consecutive day for two or three weeks without taking a minimum 36-hour rest period within any 7 consecutive days. Legislators dismissed the anonymous accusations.

In May 2008, the airline received IOSA certification.

Until June 2010, Trade Air operated scheduled flights between Zagreb, Ljubljana and Sarajevo with two Let L-410 Turbolet aircraft besides other charter flights for either cargo or passengers. In Summer 2013, Trade Air started scheduled operations supported by the Croatian Ministry for Sea Transport and Infrastructure between Osijek and Zagreb. This is the first time this route is being served after 26 years. In May 2016, Trade Air started operating scheduled flights for Croatia Airlines from Zagreb to Athens, Barcelona, Brussels, Copenhagen, Dubrovnik, and Lisbon.

In February 2017, Trade Air secured a contract with Swiss travel agency PowdAir to operate winter ski-charter flights to several destinations from Sion Airport from winter 2017.

In 2018, Trade Air has secured an ongoing contract with Israeli company Israir  for flight from Tel Aviv to destinations in Europe.

Destinations 
As of June 2018, Trade Air operates scheduled flights between the following domestic and international destinations:

Fleet

Current fleet

As of November 2021, the Trade Air fleet consists of the following aircraft:

Former fleet
The airline formerly operated aircraft cited in the table below:

Accidents and incidents
 On 30 October 2005, Trade Air Flight 729 crashed near Bergamo, Italy, shortly after taking off from Orio al Serio Airport in poor weather. The flight was a night-time cargo flight from Bergamo to Zagreb operated by a Let L-410 Turbolet with the registration 9A-BTA. All three people on board, two pilots and a passenger, were killed.
On 9 May 2021, Trade Air Flight 125 was forced to return to Ljubljana Jože Pučnik Airport after a Bird strike. No one was hurt.

References

External links 

 

Airlines of Croatia
Airlines established in 1994
Charter airlines
European Regions Airline Association
Croatian companies established in 1994